was a contemporary Japanese rock band with several albums. This band liked to focus on the greater good of children and just children in general. Most of the themes for their songs focused on the community, seeing every day as the last, and how people should act upon it. Through the mellow music, the lyrics are meant to encourage and replenish. The band's song "Taiyou no Mannaka e" was used as the third opening theme song of the anime series Eureka Seven. The band disbanded on March 1, 2009.

Biography
In 1997, the band met at Hiroshima Shudo University folk. Started from about 1999 gigs constantly, imperceptibly grown into a pretty good live band. Sweep the country in hot live performances, indie album released in 2002, "Blue Crow" sell 70,000 copies. Played a major advance in August 2003, Major 1st lead single from the album "before the cherry blossoms fall / Love Tea" in the FM radio stations across the country to "lock" a feat that won with 24 power play in this genre achieved, CS will be appointed to such office or theme music programs are focused around the hot topic. After 34 locations nationwide tour ahead anniversary album, a local festival in Hiroshima "Ebisu Kou" We gather 700 people in an unprecedented live free. Now RCC (Chūgokuhōsō) at "Radio Secret Sound Garden" (Tuesday), "Top Gear Tonight" show and regular appearances in two, making a music album.

Band members
Shinichi Tsutsumi: He provided the vocals for the band. He was born on October 11, 1977.
Katou Eizi was the guitar player of the band. He was born on August 30, 1978.
Yamamoto Kyoshichi was the bass guitar player of the band. He was born on March 10, 1978.
Tashiro Shiniti was the drum player of the band. He was born on May 16, 1977.

Discography

Albums
Aoi Karasu
Released: April 4, 2002

 
 
 
Released: March 24, 2004

Blue Bird Journey

Released: July 20, 2005

Singles
Hanbunko
Released: January 16, 2002
 Hanbunko (Halved)
 I'm walkin'
 Shiroi Tsuki (White Moon) (live version)

Seishun no Honoo
Released: March 19, 2003
 Seishun no Honoo (Fire of Youth)
 Harukaze (Spring Breeze)
 Let's Roll (instrumental)
 PLASTIC MORNING (soliloquy)

Released: January 24, 2004

Released: December 7, 2005

References

External links 
 Bivattchee Official Website
 Official Website by Sony Music

Gr8! Records artists
Sony Music Entertainment Japan artists
Japanese musical groups
Japanese rock music groups
Musical groups from Hiroshima Prefecture